Eremophanoides tanganjicae is a species of beetle in the family Cerambycidae, and the only species in the genus Eremophanoides. It was described by Breuning in 1978.

References

Apomecynini
Beetles described in 1978
Monotypic Cerambycidae genera